Sir John is primarily a nickname for Ghanaian lawyer and politician Kwadwo Owusu Afriyie.

Sir John may also refer to:

Sir John (horse), a 19th-century racehorse
Sir John (magazine), a Canadian online magazine
"Sir John", a song by Don Patterson on the album Opus De Don
Sir John (make-up artist), an American make-up artist

See also